Son Si-hyun (Hangul: 손시헌; born October 19, 1980 in Seoul) is a South Korean shortstop for the NC Dinos in the KBO League. He bats and throws right-handed.

Professional career 
In , Son went undrafted after a college career at Dong-eui University in Busan, and began his professional career with the Doosan Bears second team as a free agent trainee. After demonstrating his strong defensive abilities in the farm league, he was added to the Bears 26-man first team roster on July 1, 2003. After being promoted to the first team, he appeared in 59 games as a backup shortstop and batted .220 with 6 RBI.

In , Son became the team's full-time shortstop. For that year he played 122 games, all at shortstop, and hit .231 with 39 RBI and 45 runs. In , Son rose to his full potential, batting .276 with a career-high 59 runs and 60 RBI, and winning his first KBO League Golden Glove Award at shortstop.

After finishing the  season with a .267 batting average and 34 RBI, he left the team to serve the mandatory military commitment. During the two-year duty in Korean Armed Forces Athletic Corps, Son continued to play baseball in their baseball club on the side. In  he got called up to the national team again and competed in the IBAF Final Olympic Qualifying Tournament as the only amateur player.

After being discharged from military service at the end of 2008, Son came back to the Bears. Then he blossomed in the  season, when he posted career-highs in home runs (11), batting average (.289), hits (112), doubles (22) and stolen bases (6) with 59 RBI and 56 runs, and won his second Golden Glove Award.

On September 6, Son was selected for the South Korea national baseball team to compete in the 2010 Asian Games in Guangzhou, China.

Notable international careers

References

External links 
Career statistics and player information from Korea Baseball Organization

Son Si-hyun at NC Dinos Baseball Club 

Doosan Bears players
NC Dinos players
KBO League shortstops
South Korean baseball players
1980 births
Living people
Asian Games medalists in baseball
2013 World Baseball Classic players
Baseball players at the 2010 Asian Games
Asian Games gold medalists for South Korea
Baseball players from Seoul
Medalists at the 2010 Asian Games